Mark Smith (born 10 October 1961) is an English former footballer who played, as a full-back, for West Ham United.

Career
Smith was a product of West Ham's youth system. He played for Newham, Essex and London Boys and was an England Youth trialist before signing for West Ham in October 1979. He captained the youth team before making his West Ham debut in October 1979 in a 5–1, League Cup victory against Southend United. He was to make only one further appearance for The Hammers in the 2–0 victory against Swansea City, before his career was ended by injury.

References

Living people
1961 births
English footballers
Association football defenders
West Ham United F.C. players
English Football League players